KAFF-FM is a commercial country music radio station in Flagstaff, Arizona, broadcasting to the Flagstaff-Prescott, Arizona, area on 92.9 FM.

Translators

External links
KAFF-FM official website

AFF-FM
Radio stations established in 1968
Country radio stations in the United States